On a Misty Night is an album by saxophonist Junior Cook recorded in 1989 and released on the SteepleChase label.

Track listing 
 "On a Misty Night" (Tadd Dameron) – 6:09
 "Innocent One" (Mickey Tucker) – 5:53
 "Wabash" (Cannonball Adderley) – 7:25
 "You Know Who" (Bertha Hope) – 9:03
 "Make the Girl Love Me" (Arthur Schwartz, Dorothy Fields) – 10:14
 "My Sweet Pumpkin" (Ronnell Bright) – 10:15
 "Nothing Ever Changes" (Jack Segal, Marvin Fisher) – 8:15
 "I'll Go My Way by Myself" (Schwartz, Howard Dietz) – 7:27

Personnel 
Junior Cook – tenor saxophone
Mickey Tucker – piano
Walter Booker – bass
Leroy Williams – drums

References 

Junior Cook albums
1990 albums
SteepleChase Records albums